Fu Zhongwen (1903–1994) was a respected t'ai chi ch'uan teacher and author from China.  From an early age, he had been a disciple of Yang Chengfu, and later a family member as he married Zou Kuei Cheng, the great-granddaughter of Yang Chien Hou.

Fu Zhongwen was born in Yongnian, Hebei province. As a child, he would watch people practise t'ai chi and imitate their moves before beginning his training with Master Yang Chengfu at the young age of 9. Zhongwen’s personal diligence and application in learning t'ai chi ch'uan saw him advance rapidly in the knowledge and expertise of t'ai chi.

As Zhongwen matured, he accompanied Yang in his travels around China from Wuhan to Guangzhou, demonstrating t'ai chi and helping to teach along the way. Yang Chengfu would teach and Zhongwen would demonstrate. Fu Zhongwen would often accept challenges from other martial artists, not once failing to uphold his master's honour.

Fu Zhongwen was often called upon by his master to represent him in pushing hands competitions and he earned the reputation of being an undefeatable opponent. So highly regarded was he by his peers, that Yang's first disciple Chen Weiming wrote a letter to him after Chengfu's death, acknowledging the excellence of Zhongwen's accomplishment and the accuracy with which he reflected their master’s art.

In 1944, Fu Zhongwen founded the Yongnian Tai Chi Association in order to carry on the work of his master in spreading t'ai chi ch'uan to all people. When he founded the Yongnian Association, he selected diligence, perseverance, respect, and sincerity as their motto.  Fu Zhongwen lived his life according to the above motto.  The reason he chose Yongnian as the name was because Yong Nian in Chinese means longevity - the main purpose of establishing the association was to teach T'ai chi, allowing the people to benefit from practicing t'ai chi to live longer.

As the Association grew in Shanghai, classes often included more than eighty students. Fu Zhongwen continued to supervise the group, while delegating responsibility to select disciples and assistants, such as Xie Bingcan.

In 1959, the PRC featured Fu Zhongwen’s t'ai chi sabre in its international sports publication. The PRC also published his book, entitled "Yang Family Tai Chi Chuan" in 1963.

In 1972, the Tongji University in Shanghai carried out a scientific research on the therapeutic value of t'ai chi on patients with Fu Zhongwen and his son Fu Sheng Yuan as instructors. After 3 months, the results achieved with some medical conditions including heart diseases, spleen dysfunction, arthritis and insomnia. This propelled the Ministry of Sports to officially recognize the therapeutic value of T'ai chi.

Fu Zhongwen was the type of man who was willing to teach t'ai chi to whoever wanted to learn for free; the only benefit to him was the knowledge that people were doing t'ai chi and gaining health from it. Fu Zhongwen is a true legacy in the t'ai chi world.

Fu Zhongwen had dedicated his life to practicing and teaching T'ai chi. He was voted as one of the One Hundred Living Treasures of China and it was a great loss to the martial arts world and a greater loss to his family when he died in Shanghai on September 25, 1994 at age 92.

Fu Shengyuan continues his father's quest in spreading Yang t'ai chi to the world.

T'ai chi ch'uan lineage tree with Yang-style focus

Notes

References

External links

Yang Tai Chi from the lineage of Grand Master Fu Zhongwen
Fu Sheng Yuan Tai chi Academy - India Chapter

Chinese tai chi practitioners
1903 births
1994 deaths
Sportspeople from Handan